The GMT900 was a General Motors full-size pickup and SUV platform used for the 2007 to 2014 model years. The platform was introduced at the 2006 North American International Auto Show, as the replacement for the GMT800 platform. The first GMT900 vehicle introduced was the next-generation Chevrolet Tahoe.

GMT900 had been called a "Hail Mary pass" for the General Motors Corporation — the company needed the revenue from these large trucks to ensure their financial solvency. The company's resources were focused exclusively on GMT900 development through 2005, delaying other programs like the GM Zeta platform. With the 2005 spike in gasoline prices, some analysts have questioned the wisdom of "betting the company" on a line of large trucks. Sales were initially brisk, but later dropped off as the market moved to more fuel-efficient unibody vehicles.

The GMT900 series features standard vehicle stability control. Original plans called for American Axle's "I-Ride" independent suspension module in the rear, but was never used.

Tahoe production began at GM's Arlington Assembly plant in Arlington, Texas on December 1, 2005, six weeks ahead of schedule. Production of the SWB versions began at Janesville Assembly in Janesville, Wisconsin in early January 2006. Production of long wheelbase trucks (Suburban/Yukon XL) begins in Janesville and at Silao Assembly in Silao, Guanajuato, in March. The Avalanche will be produced only in Silao. Escalade production began in March 2006, with the ESV being produced in Arlington and the EXT being produced in Silao.

The SUVs began to show up at dealers in January 2006. Sales initially exceeded expectations, but by 2008, General Motors announced they were significantly cutting back production. GM has closed the SUV plant in Janesville, Wisconsin, consolidating SUV production in Arlington, Texas.

The related Silverado and Sierra pickups started production in late 2006. The HUMMER H2 was meant to move to the new platform in the next few years, but has since been cancelled.

Due to a long-lasting downturn in sales of full-size trucks and SUVs in the United States (up to a 30% down through the first nine months of 2008), General Motors cancelled the next-generation CXX truck program in May 2008. Along with it, the replacements for the Chevrolet Tahoe and Suburban and their siblings at GMC and Cadillac.

The automotive press has speculated that some GMT900 SUV models may move to the GM Lambda platform.

On January 14, 2010, General Motors announced that they will resume development of full-size trucks and SUVs.

Applications

References

See also

 GM GMT platform

General Motors platforms